The Cedar Mountain Wilderness is located in northwestern Utah, United States, just south of Interstate 80. The vegetation on the upper elevations of the Cedar Mountains is dominated by junipers (referred to as "cedars" by early pioneers). The foothill and valley regions include mixed desert shrubs. Cheatgrass is prevalent over large areas burned by range fires. The remains of an aragonite mining camp can also be found in the foothills.

The Cedar Mountain Wilderness includes more than half of the  Cedar Mountain Herd Management Area, where feral horses have grazed since they were introduced in the late 19th century. A survey conducted in December 1991 counted 444 horses, and parts of the herd can often be seen on the wilderness. The Bureau of Land Management fills watering troughs for the horses when springs dry up in the summer. This artificial water supply benefits other wildlife species such as pronghorn antelope.

The U.S. Congress designated the Cedar Mountain Wilderness, in an effort sponsored by Utah representative Rob Bishop and the Utah governor, to block rail access to a proposed high-level nuclear waste storage facility on the nearby Skull Valley Indian Reservation. The project was sponsored by a consortium of nuclear power companies known as Private Fuel Storage. The project was killed in 2012 amid legal obstacles and substantial local opposition.

See also

 Dugway Proving Grounds
 List of U.S. Wilderness Areas
 National Wilderness Preservation System
 Wilderness Act

References

 Lynna P. Howard, Utah's Wilderness Areas: The Complete Guide (Westcliffe Publishers, 2005) 
 Bill Cunningham & Polly Burke, Wild Utah: A Guide to 45 Roadless Recreation Areas (Falcon Publishing, 1998) 
 Bureau of Land Management, Utah BLM Statewide Wilderness Final Environmental Impact Statement: Volume II West-Central Region (BLM Utah State Office, 1990)

External links
 Bureau of Land Management: Cedar Mountain Wilderness
 Wilderness.net: Cedar Mountain Wilderness
 Google Maps satellite view

Wilderness areas of Utah
Protected areas of Tooele County, Utah
IUCN Category Ib
Bureau of Land Management areas in Utah